Emma Zielke (born 19 April 1988) is a retired Australian rules footballer who played for the Brisbane Lions in the AFL Women's competition. She was the club's inaugural AFLW team captain, leading the club in 2017–2018 and 2020–2021.

Early life and state league football
Zielke was born and raised in Bundaberg, Queensland. She grew up a passionate Brisbane Broncos fan and played soccer from the age of 6. Following high school graduation, Zielke moved to Brisbane to pursue greater opportunities in soccer but quickly lost passion for the sport and tried her hand at Australian rules football after being convinced by friends to try the sport. She first played Aussie rules in 2008 at the age of 19 for her local club Morningside.

She was selected to participate in the women's AFL high-performance camp in 2010. After the team at Morningside folded, Zielke approached the Coorparoo Football Club about establishing a women's team in 2013, to play in the AFL Queensland Women's League (QAWFL). She was the club's inaugural captain. In 2013, a broken arm forced Zielke to miss a considerable period of football, including a chance to play in the first women's AFL exhibition match. She returned to football late in the season and captained Coorparoo to a state-league premiership. She kicked a goal after the siren to win the game.

In 2014 and 2015, she captained her second and third consecutive QAWFL premierships, while also being awarded the league's best and fairest in both years. Zielke moved again in 2016, this time to the University of Queensland side competing again in the QAWFL. She was named in the league's team of the year at the conclusion of the season. In 2014, Zielke was drafted by  ahead of the years women's AFL exhibition match. She was not retained after that year's match and would subsequently re-nominate for the draft in 2015. She later played in and captained the Brisbane Lion's representative side in the 2016 exhibition series. Zielke has captained Queensland at three AFL Women's National Championships.

AFL Women's career
She completed a reduced pre-season ahead of 2017, after breaking her foot in September 2016. Zielke was named the club's inaugural AFL Women's captain in January 2017.

Zielke was highlighted as "Player of the Week" for her round 3 performance in the 2017 AFL Women's season. It was the second round in a row that a Brisbane Lions player received this honor from the AFL Players Association. At the end of the season, Zielke was nominated by her teammates for the AFLW Players’ Most Valuable Player Award, and was also listed in the 2017 40-player All-Australian squad.

On 17 May 2017, Brisbane announced they has signed Zielke for the 2018 season.

In April 2021, following Brisbane's 18-point Grand Final victory over Adelaide to claim the 2021 AFL Women's season premiership. The Emma Zielke Medal, the medal awarded to the best and fairest player in the AFL Queensland Women's League, was named after her in August 2021, due to her work in pioneering women's football in Queensland.

Personal life
Off-field, Zielke works as an admin support officer at the Brisbane Lions. She also has worked as an assistant coach of the Queensland under 18 youth girls team.

References

External links

1988 births
Living people
Brisbane Lions (AFLW) players
Australian rules footballers from Queensland
Sportswomen from Queensland
Sportspeople from Brisbane